An alga (plural algae) is a type of photosynthetic organism.

Alga may also refer to:

Places

Burkina Faso
Alga, Burkina Faso
Alga-Fulbé

Italy
San Giorgio in Alga, an island of the Venetian lagoon, northern Italy

Kazakhstan
Alga District
Alga, Kazakhstan, a town in the Alga District; one of a number of communities in Kazahstan with this name

Kyrgyzstan
Alga, Kadamjay, Kadamjay District, Batken Region
Alga, Leylek, Leylek District, Batken Region
Alga, Chüy, Chüy District, Chüy Region
Alga, Osh, Özgön District, Osh Region

Other uses 
 AlGa, an aluminium-gallium alloy
 "Alga!", a Crimean Tatar war cry.

See also
Algae (disambiguation)
Algal